Jordan Tyler Graham (born 5 March 1995) is a professional footballer who plays for  club Birmingham City. A product of Aston Villa's academy, where he spent 12 years, Graham played league football for Ipswich Town, Bradford City, Wolverhampton Wanderers, Oxford United, Fulham and Gillingham before joining Birmingham City in 2021. Internationally, he represented both England, his native country, and the Republic of Ireland, for which he qualified by descent, at youth level.

Club career

Aston Villa
Graham is a product of the Aston Villa youth academy and signed a two-year professional contract in March 2012. He was a member of their NextGen Series-winning side in the 2012–13 season.

In November 2013, Graham joined Championship club Ipswich Town on a month's loan. He made his senior debut on 7 December in a 2–1 win over Huddersfield Town, and also made a brief appearance in the victory over Doncaster Rovers before returning to Villa at the end of December.

On 10 January 2014, he signed for League One club Bradford City on a one-month loan. He played only once, against his future club Wolverhampton Wanderers on 1 February.

Wolverhampton Wanderers
Graham joined Wolverhampton Wanderers, now returned to the Championship, in November 2014 on loan until the January transfer window. Injury prevented him from making any first-team appearances during this loan period, but on 5 January 2015 he signed a permanent 18-month deal with the club for an undisclosed fee.

After failing to make a first-team appearance for Wolves, he joined Oxford United of League Two in September 2015. Following a successful initial month, his loan was extended by two months, but a few days later he was recalled because of an injury crisis at his parent club.

Graham made his Wolves debut on 21 November in the starting eleven for the visit to Ipswich Town, and scored his first senior goal on 28 December 2015 in the 52nd minute of a Championship game against Charlton Athletic at The Valley, which Woles won 2–0. He suffered torn knee ligaments during a game against Cardiff City on 16 January 2016. Despite this, Graham extended his contract with Wolves until the end of the 2017–18 season, with the club having the option of two additional years. He was initially expected to be out of action for between nine and twelve months, but after suffering several setbacks during his recovery, he did not return to first-team football until 15 months later, on 25 April 2017, in a 1–0 defeat against Huddersfield at Molineux.

Loans
On 31 August 2017, he joined Championship rivals Fulham on loan until the end of the season, but returned to his parent club in mid-January 2018 having made just three substitute appearances.

On 28 August 2018, Graham signed for Ipswich Town on a season-long loan. After Paul Lambert replaced Paul Hurst as Ipswich manager, Graham began training with Oxford United, with a view to a loan in January, which was confirmed in December 2018. He scored his first Oxford goal, and the second League goal of his career, with a well-taken free kick in a surprise away victory over Blackpool on 23 February 2019.

A loan was agreed for Graham and Wolves team-mate Sylvain Deslandes at Bulgarian club Lokomotiv Plovdiv for the 2019–20 season, but it fell through due to an issue with FIFA clearance. Graham made an appearance for Wolves U21 in the EFL Trophy game against Blackpool, which ended in a 1–0 defeat.

Gillingham
On 31 January 2020, Graham signed for League One club Gillingham on a six-month loan. He made seven league appearances before the league was suspended and subsequently ended early because of the COVID-19 pandemic. He returned to Wolves, who confirmed on 18 May 2020 that he had left the club.

He signed for Gillingham permanently on 12 August 2020.

Birmingham City
On 24 June 2021, Graham signed a two-year contract with a one-year option with Championship club Birmingham City, to begin on 1 July when his Gillingham contract expired. He made his debut in the starting eleven for Birmingham's 1–0 win against Colchester United in the EFL Cup first round.

International career
Graham represented England at under-16 and under-17 levels. He was a member of the England U16 squad that retained the 2010–11 Victory Shield. He also represented England U17, playing in and winning the 2012 Algarve Tournament. Graham also played for the Republic of Ireland at under-15 level in the 2010 Tri-Nations tournament, scoring twice against Northern Ireland U15s.

Career statistics

Honours
Aston Villa U19
NextGen Series: 2012–13

References

External links

1995 births
Living people
Footballers from Coventry
Association football wingers
English footballers
Republic of Ireland association footballers
Republic of Ireland youth international footballers
England youth international footballers
Aston Villa F.C. players
Ipswich Town F.C. players
Bradford City A.F.C. players
Wolverhampton Wanderers F.C. players
Oxford United F.C. players
Fulham F.C. players
Gillingham F.C. players
Birmingham City F.C. players
English Football League players
Black British sportspeople
English people of Irish descent